The 2008 Best Buy 400 benefiting Student Clubs for Autism Speaks was the thirteenth race of the 2008 NASCAR Sprint Cup schedule which was run on Sunday, June 1 at Dover International Speedway in Delaware's state capital, and serves as a fundraiser for Autism Speaks, with $5 from each ticket sold benefitting the charity. The race was the final NASCAR telecast on Fox for the 2008 season starting at 1:30 PM US EDT and on radio via MRN and Sirius Satellite Radio at 1:15 PM US EDT.

Pre-race news
John Andretti, after finishing 16th in the Indianapolis 500, returned to the #34 Chevrolet of Front Row Motorsports replacing Jeff Green.
With Dario Franchitti sitting out again this week (he would run in the NNS race the day before,) Jeremy Mayfield got a one-off try in the #40 Chip Ganassi Racing Dodge, qualifying an impressive 10th.
Robby Gordon, owner/driver of the #7 Dodge, was in Baja 500 this weekend, so Craftsman Truck Series driver Matt Crafton subbed for Gordon in qualifying and practice on Friday and Saturday.  No matter what happened, the #7 Dodge started in the back as the owner is expected to drive on Sunday.

Qualifying
Greg Biffle earned his 5th Cup Career pole by qualifying first for the Best Buy 400, with a time of 23.193 and a speed of 155.219. Starting alongside him was Kurt Busch, the 2004 NASCAR Nextel Cup Series Champion, with a time of 23.381.

OP: qualified via owners points

PC: qualified as past champion

PR: provisional

QR: via qualifying race

* - had to qualify on time

Failed to qualify, withdrew, or driver changes:   Jason Leffler (#70), Chad McCumbee (#45), Matt Crafton (#7-DC), Tony Raines (#08-WD)

Race recap
There was a major wreck on lap 17 that claimed many of the front runners for the lead. This occurred when David Gilliland and Elliott Sadler touched, putting Sadler in the middle of the backstretch. Clint Bowyer, Kasey Kahne, Denny Hamlin, Paul Menard, Elliott Sadler, Tony Stewart, Bill Elliott, Kevin Harvick, Bobby Labonte, Scott Riggs, and Dale Earnhardt Jr. were all caught up in the wreck. When the smoke cleared, Kyle Busch won his fourth race of 2008.

Results

References 

Best Buy 400 benefiting Student Clubs for Autism Speaks
Best Buy 400 benefiting Student Clubs for Autism Speaks
Sociological and cultural aspects of autism
NASCAR races at Dover Motor Speedway